Tresgrandas is one of 28 parishes in Llanes, a municipality within the province and autonomous community of Asturias, in coastal northern Spain. 

References

Parishes in Llanes